Statistics Iceland is the main official institute providing statistics on the nation of Iceland. It was created by the Althing in 1913, began operations in 1914 and became an independent government agency under the Prime Minister's Office on 1 January 2008.

See also 
 Minister of Statistics Iceland

References

External links 
  
  

1914 establishments in Iceland
Organizations established in 1914
Iceland
Government agencies of Iceland